Common Grackle is a Canadian musical duo consisting of singer-songwriter Gregory Pepper and producer Factor.

Discography
 The Great Depression (2010)
 The Great Repression (2011)

References

External links
 

Canadian musical duos